Counterpart or Counterparts may refer to:

Entertainment and literature
 "Counterparts" (short story), by James Joyce
 Counterparts, former name for the Reel Pride LGBT film festival
 Counterparts (film), a 2007 German drama
 Counterpart (TV series), American 2017 sci-fi thriller

Music
 Counterparts (band), a Canadian hardcore punk band
 Counterparts (Rush album), 1993
 Counterparts (Revolutionary Ensemble album), 2012

Other 
 In paleontology, one half of a split compression fossil
 Counterpart International, a U.S.-based development charity

See also
 Counterpart theory, in metaphysics and philosophy
 Counterparty, in contract law
 Analogue (disambiguation)